The Eel River is a  tributary of the Wabash River in northern Indiana in the United States. Via the Wabash and Ohio rivers, its waters flow to the Mississippi River and ultimately the Gulf of Mexico. The Eel River rises southeast of Huntertown in Allen County and flows southwest through Allen, Whitley, Kosciusko, Wabash, Miami, and Cass counties to join the Wabash at Logansport. The river was called Kineepikwameekwa Siipiiwi - "river of the snake fish" by the Miami people, who inhabited the area at the time of European contact, the English rendered it as Ke-na-po-co-mo-co. It is the northern of the two rivers named Eel River within Indiana.

Origins and history

Natural history
Originating as an "ice-marginal channel" at the edge of the retreating Saginaw Lobe of the Wisconsin Glacier, the Eel River was later buried by the glacier's advancing Erie Lobe. As the Erie Lobe retreated, the Eel formed a single stream with what is now upper Cedar Creek in DeKalb and Allen counties. The ancestral Eel River was also fed by glacial meltwater surging under the ice from the southeast through a "tunnel valley" known today as Cedar Creek Canyon. Blockage of the Eel's channel by outwash from the canyon and a decline in the volume of meltwater forced the upper Eel to change course into the canyon, creating today's Cedar Creek. This is a classic example of stream piracy that shifted almost  of land from the Eel-Wabash watershed to that of the St. Joseph-Maumee.

Indigenous peoples and French exploration
The waterways were where indigenous peoples settled in prehistoric and historic times, as they were sources of food and water, and the avenues for transportation and trade.  The Miami, an Algonquian-speaking people, called the river Kineepikwameekwa Siipiiwi or Ke-na-po-co-mo-co, meaning "river of the snake fish." Later French explorers, who also followed the waterways, called it the Rivière L'Anguille (Eel River).

Political and military history

Before the United States consolidated its hold on the Northwest Territory, the Eel formed a rough boundary between the Potawatomi tribe on the north and the Miami tribe on the south. In addition, it was an area of competition between French and British colonial forces for decades before the American Revolution.  Afterward, the US fought with American Indians in numerous battles sometimes called the Northwest Indian War.

In November 1780, a French militia force under Auguste Mottin de la Balme, who planned to seize a British trading post on the Eel near present-day Columbia City, was destroyed by the Miami led by Chief Michikinikwa, also known as "Little Turtle". On 19 October 1790, Chief Michikinikwa's warriors surprised and virtually annihilated a U.S. force under Colonel John Hardin in the Eel bottomlands southeast of present-day Churubusco.

In September 1812, Colonel James Simrall, acting under orders from General William Henry Harrison, ravaged Miami farms and villages along the Eel in present-day Whitley County.  He defeated a Miami force that stood and fought.

Literary reference
Ross Lockridge Jr., Raintree County, Boston: Houghton Mifflin (1948), pp. 93–94.

See also
List of rivers of Indiana
Eel River Tribe

Notes and references

Bibliography

External links
Sequential Development of Eel River and Cedar Creek
Little Turtle, the Great Eel River Chief DEAD LINK
The Eel River Post and Fort DEAD LINK
Along the Eel DEAD LINK
Introduction to the Eel River DEAD LINK
The Eel River of Northern Indiana DEAD LINK

Rivers of Indiana
Battle of Eel River
Tributaries of the Wabash River
Rivers of Cass County, Indiana
Rivers of Miami County, Indiana
Rivers of Wabash County, Indiana
Rivers of Kosciusko County, Indiana
Rivers of Whitley County, Indiana
Rivers of Allen County, Indiana